Saiyan is a 1951 Bollywood film-Hindi romantic drama directed by M. Sadiq for his Sadiq Productions Ltd. The story and screenplay were written by Azmi Bazidpuri. The music was composed by Sajjad Hussain, with lyrics written by D. N. Madhok, Rajendra Krishan and Hasrat Jaipuri. The film stars Madhubala, Ajit, Sajjan, and Jayant. It was both a critical and commercial success.

A period film depicting feudal India, the plot is remade from the American Western Duel In the Sun (1946). A love triangle, the story revolves around two brothers (Ajit and Sajjan), both in love with an orphan girl (Madhubala), who is given shelter by their family.

Plot

Cast
 Madhubala as Saiyan  
 Ajit as Vijay  
 Sajjan as Rajjoo  
 Raj Mehra as Thakor Sahib  
 Leela Chitnis as Rani Sahiba  
 Jayant    
 Abbas    
 Ramesh Thakur
 Ramesh Sinha 
 Amar    
 Amir Ali    
 Kathana    
 Cuckoo

Soundtrack
The music composer was Sajjad Hussain with lyrics by D. N. Madhok and Rajendra Krishan. The playback singers were Lata Mangeshkar, Mohammed Rafi and Shamshad Begum. The song "Tumhe Dil Diya" sung by Lata Mangeshkar, was not used in the film.

Songlist

Reception
Saiyan was extensively praised by international film critic Roger Yoe. He, in the Singapore Free Press, called the film "splendour and magnificen[t]" and stated that it is "cleverly directed and well-photographed". Yoe also took notice of  Madhubala's portrayal of the title role and referred it to as "perfect".

Upon its theatrical release, Saiyan proved a hit with the audience. The film ran to packed houses throughout India and did extremely well at the box office.

Writer Ganga Prasad Sharma called Saiyan the best film starring Sajjan in the leading role.

References

External links
 

1951 films
1950s Hindi-language films
Indian remakes of American films
Films scored by Sajjad Hussain
Indian romantic drama films
1951 romantic drama films
Indian black-and-white films
Films directed by M. Sadiq